McKinley "Bunny" Downs (March 7, 1894 - June 30, 1973) was a Negro leagues infielder and manager for several years before the founding of the first Negro National League, and in its first several seasons.

A native of Chattanooga, Tennessee, Downs attended Morris Brown College in Atlanta, Georgia. He made his Negro leagues debut in 1914 with the West Baden Sprudels, and went on to play for several teams, including a six-year stretch from 1917 to 1922 with the Hilldale Club. At age 56, Downs received votes listing him on the 1952 Pittsburgh Courier player-voted poll of the Negro leagues' best players ever. He died in Winston-Salem, North Carolina in 1973 at age 79.

References

External links
 and Baseball-Reference Black Baseball stats and Seamheads
 

Negro league baseball managers
Brooklyn Royal Giants players
Bacharach Giants players
Harrisburg Giants players
Hilldale Club players
Louisville White Sox (1914-1915) players
Philadelphia Tigers players
Wilmington Potomacs players
Baseball players from Tennessee
Sportspeople from Chattanooga, Tennessee
1894 births
1973 deaths
20th-century African-American sportspeople